This list of comics awards is an index to articles about notable awards for comics from around the world.  The list includes awards given out for achievements in cartooning, comic books, comic strips and graphic novels. Some works in comics are also eligible for, and in some instances have won literary awards.

American awards
In chronological order from date of first award presentation:

 Pulitzer Prize for Editorial Cartooning — first awarded 1922
 Reuben Award — first awarded in 1946
Various National Cartoonists Society awards — first awarded in 1948
 Alley Award — first awarded in 1961; ceased in 1969
 Shazam Award — first awarded in 1970; ceased in 1974
 Goethe Award (later renamed "Comic Fan Art Awards") — first awarded in 1970; ceased in 1974.
 Ignatz Awards (OrlandoCon) — first awarded in 1974; ceased in 1994
 Inkpot Awards — first awarded in 1974
 Comics Buyer's Guide Fan Awards — first awarded in 1982; ceased in 2008
 Russ Manning Award — first awarded in 1982
 Jack Kirby Comics Industry Award — first awarded in 1985, ceased in 1987 (split into Harvey Award and Eisner Award)
 Harvey Awards — first awarded in 1988
 Will Eisner Comics Industry Awards — first awarded in 1988
 Compuserve Comics and Animation Forum's Don Thompson Awards (colloquially known as the "Don Thompson Awards") — first awarded in 1992; ceased in 1998
 Wizard Fan Awards — first awarded in 1993; ceased in 2006
 Lulu Awards — first awarded in 1997; ceased in 2011
 Ignatz Awards (Small Press Expo) — first awarded 1997
 Howard E. Day Prize — first awarded in 2001; ceased in 2007 (renamed the "Gene Day Award for Self-Publishing," now part of the Joe Shuster Canadian Comic Book Creator Awards)
 Day Prize/SPACE Prize (Small Press and Alternative Comics Expo)— first awarded in 2001
 Bill Finger Award — first awarded in 2005
 Glyph Comics Awards — first awarded in 2005
 Inkwell Awards — first awarded in 2008
 Ghastly Awards for Excellence in Horror Comics — first awarded 2011; ceased in 2017
 Dwayne McDuffie Award for Diversity in Comics – first awarded in 2015
 Dwayne McDuffie Award for Kids' Comics — first awarded in 2015
 Emerging Artist Prize (Cartoon Crossroads Columbus) — first awarded in 2015
 Ringo Awards (Baltimore Comic-Con) — first awarded in 2017

Timeline of notable U.S. comics awards 
The following is a timeline of notable U.S. comics awards that feature multiple categories. Awards voted on by professionals are in shades of blue; fan awards are in shades of red. (The Ignatz Award is a mixture, as the nominees are selected by professionals, but the winners are determined by the attendees of that year's Small Press Expo.)

Australian awards
Ledger Awards – first awarded in 2004
Aurealis Award for best illustrated book or graphic novel

Belgian awards
 Bronzen Adhemar – first awarded in 1977
 Prix Saint-Michel – first awarded in 1971
 Atomium comic strip prizes – first awarded in 2017

Brazilian awards 

 Prêmio Abril de Jornalismo, category "Comics" — first awarded in 1976; ceased in 1998.
 Prêmio Angelo Agostini – first awarded in 1985.
 Troféu HQ Mix – first awarded in 1989.
 Prêmio DB Artes — first awarded in 2003; ceased in 2010.
 Troféu Alfaiataria de Fanzines — awarded only in 2007.
 Troféu Bigorna — first awarded in 2008; ceased in 2010.
 Prêmio Claudio Seto — first awarded in 2014.
 Prêmio Al Rio — first awarded in 2015; ceased in 2018.
 Prêmio ABRAHQ — first awarded in 2016; ceased in 2017
 Prêmio Grampo — first awarded in 2016.
 Prêmio Dente de Ouro — first awarded in 2016; ceased in 2020.
 Prêmio Jabuti for Best Comic Book — first awarded in 2017.
 Prêmio LeBlanc — first awarded in 2018.
 Dia do Super-Herói Brasileiro — first awarded in 2020.
 Prêmio Odisseia de Literatura Fantástica for Best Comics — first awarded in 2021.
 Prêmio Mapinguari — first awarded in 2022.
 CCXP Awards — first awarded in 2022.

Timeline of Brazilian comics awards

British awards
 Ally Sloper Award — 1976–c. 1982
 Eagle Awards — 1977–1990; 2000–2014 (2014 as "True Believer Comic Awards")
 UK Comic Art Awards — 1990–1997
 Mel Calman Awards/Young Cartoonist of the Year Award — 1995–present
 Cartoon Art Trust Awards — 1997–2017
 National Comics Awards — 1997–1999, 2001–2003
 SICBA (Scottish Independent Comic Book Alliance Awards) — held in conjunction with the Glasgow Comic Con and first awarded 2011; still ongoing
 Excelsior Award —  a single award for middle-grade comics/manga; first awarded in 2011 (as the "Stan Lee Excelsior Award"); organized by Paul Register
 British Comic Awards — 2012–2016 (in conjunction with the Thought Bubble Festival)
 The 9th Art Award — inaugural award announced 2013; sponsored by Graphic Scotland
 Comics Laureate — first awarded in 2014; sponsored by Comics Literacy Awareness

Timeline of British comics awards

Canadian awards

 Prix Bédéis Causa –  awarded to French language comics by the Festival de la BD francophone de Québec since 1988
 Bédélys Prize – awarded to French language comics since 2000
 The Doug Wright Awards – first awarded in 2005
 National Newspaper Awards of Canada include a category for Editorial Cartoonist
 Joe Shuster Awards – first awarded in 2005

Dutch awards
 Stripschapprijs – first awarded in 1974
 Willy Vandersteenprijs – first awarded in 2010
 VPRO Debuutprijs – first awarded in 1994
 Marten Toonderprijs – first awarded in 2009

French awards
 Angoulême International Comics Festival Prizes – first awarded in 1974
 Prix de la critique – first awarded in 1984

German awards
 Max & Moritz Prizes – first awarded in 1984
  – first awarded in 2016, the aim is to foster the appreciation of graphical literature as an art form; awarded in 18 categories for works and 12 categories for artists.
 Ginco Award – first awarded in 2020
 Sondermann Award – first awarded in 2004
  – first awarded in 1994

Greek awards 
  – first awarded in 2005 and known as Comicdom Awards until 2015

Irish awards
 The Drunken Druid Awards

Indian awards
 Kalpana Lok Awards
 Indian Comics Fandom Awards
 Comic Con India Awards
 Narayan Debntah Comics Puroskar

Italian awards
  – awarded between 1970 and 2005
  / Pantera di Lucca Comics – first awarded in 1967
  (Napoli Comicon prizes) – first awarded in 1998

Japanese awards

 Akatsuka Award – first awarded in 1974
 Dengeki Comic Grand Prix – first awarded in 2001
 Gaiman Award – first awarded in 2011
 International Manga Award – first awarded in 2007
 Japan Cartoonists Association Award – first awarded in 1972
 Kodansha Manga Award – first awarded in 1960
 Manga Taishō – first awarded in 2008
 Tezuka Osamu Cultural Prize – first awarded in 1997
 Shogakukan Manga Award – first awarded in 1955
 Tezuka Award – first awarded in 1971

Norwegian awards
 Sproing Award – first awarded in 1987

Polish awards
 Grand Prix Międzynarodowego Festiwalu Komiksu – first awarded in 1991

Portugal awards
 Prémios Nacionais de Banda Desenhada — First awarded in 1990
 Galardões BD Comic Con Portugal — First awarded in 2015
 Geeks d'Ouro — First awarded in 2018

Qatar awards
 Arab Cartoon Award – 1st in 2012.

Singaporean awards
 ComiIdol – Awarded in three categories via popular vote in 2007

Spanish awards
 Barcelona International Comics Convention Prizes – first awarded in 1988
 Haxtur Awards – first awarded in 1985

Swedish awards
 Adamson Awards – first awarded in 1965
 Urhunden Prizes – first awarded in 1987

See also

 Lists of awards
 List of webcomic awards
 List of media awards
 List of toys and children's media awards

References

External links 
 "Comic Book Awards Almanac," at HahnLibrary.net

 
Awards
Lists of awards